Douglas Ivester (born 1947) is an American businessman. He served as the chairman and chief executive officer of The Coca-Cola Company from 1997 to 2000.

Early life
Melvin Douglas Ivester was born in 1947 in New Holland, Georgia. He attended New Holland Elementary School, where he met Kay Grindle in the third grade.  He grew up to marry her.  He attended North Hall High School and went on to the University of Georgia, where he earned a degree in accounting, graduating with honors in 1969.

Career
Ivester began his career with the accounting firm of Ernst and Ernst.

In 1979, Ivester joined Coca-Cola as assistant controller and director of corporate auditing, and in 1981 he became the youngest vice president in the company's history. Two years later he was elected senior vice president of finance, and in 1985 he was elected CFO at the age of 37. Ivester was elected chairman of the board and chief executive officer of The Coca-Cola Company on October 23, 1997.  Ivester received a retirement package estimated to be worth $166 million. Ivester received the FIFA Order of Merit in 1996.

Ivester serves on the board of director of SunTrust Banks.

In 1996 Ivester was honored with an Edison Achievement Award for his commitment to innovation throughout his career.

Philanthropy
Ivester contributes to the University of Georgia, Terry College of Business as Executive-at-Large through the "Deer Run Fellows" program.

References

External links

Deer Run Fellows

Living people
1947 births
People from Hall County, Georgia
Terry College of Business alumni
American chief executives of food industry companies
American corporate directors
Coca-Cola people
20th-century American businesspeople
SunTrust Banks people